Jared Brown (born April 27, 1973) is a former American football quarterback who played one season with the San Jose SaberCats of the Arena Football League. He played college football at the University of Nevada, Las Vegas.

References

External links
Just Sports Stats
College stats

Living people
1973 births
Players of American football from Sacramento, California
American football quarterbacks
UNLV Rebels football players
San Jose SaberCats players